José Manuel Sulantay Silva (born 3 April 1940) is a former football player and manager. He notably managed the Chile U20 and Chile U17 national team, leading the Chile U20 to a third-place finish at the 2007 FIFA U-20 World Cup in Canada. At a FIFA level, Sulantay is Chile's second most successful coach after Fernando Riera.

Playing career
Sulantay was born in Coquimbo, Chile. He officially debuted with Deportes La Serena in 1957. There, he highlighted as right back or right wing. This allowed him being called to Chilean national U-20 team that participated in the 1958 South American Championship held in his country. 

After losing with Serena the 1959 Copa Chile final against Santiago Wanderers, in 1960 he achieved with the team that season's Copa Chile edition. Equally, in 1959 he was the cup's top scorer with six goals alongside Juan Soto ―from Colo-Colo― and Héctor Torres from Magallanes.

Managerial career

Early seasons: 1976–1989
After being promoted to Coquimbo Unido's first adult team by Enrique Hormazábal (nicknamed «Cuá-cuá»), he was the manager of both Coquimbo Unido and Deportes La Serena for twelve years.

Cobreloa
In 1992, he achieved a Primera División de Chile title with the club.

Chile youth teams: 2003–2007
During 2007 FIFA Youth World Cup, on 20 June, his team was involved in a clash with the Canadian police after the players tried to cross security barriers to meet with fans, conflict that even extended to Harold Mayne-Nicholls —president of the ANFP— who was beaten by Toronto's police. These events even transcended beyond football by provoking complaints from the President Michelle Bachelet, the Chilean consul in Toronto and Human Rights Watch director José Miguel Vivanco. Days later also FIFA president Joseph Blatter condemned the violence from Canadian police.

After Chile U20's performance in 2007 FIFA Youth World Cup, he was the candidate to replace Nelson Acosta in the adult national team. Nevertheless, on 30 July, he officially declined. Likewise, according journalist Francisco Sagredo, this option didn't prosper because Sulantay would have broken the confidentiality pact by telling this possibility to media.

Municipal Iquique
On 5 January 2008, he joined Primera B side Municipal Iquique.

On 11 September 2008, he renounced to Iquique's bench.

Return to Coquimbo
In early 2010, it was reported that he re-joined to Coquimbo Unido.

Return to Cobreloa
On 20 January 2017, he was appointed as new coach of Cobreloa.

Coaching style
According him:

Political career
In 2012, he competed for being major of Coquimbo as an independent with support from conservative party Independent Democratic Union («UDI»). However, he lost the elections against Cristian Galleguillos from Christian Democratic Party, who obtained a 45,6% instead Sulantay's 27,5% (he finished second in the election).

Honors

Player
Deportes La Serena
 Segunda División de Chile: 1957
 Copa Chile: 1960

Individual
 Copa Chile top scorer: 1959

Manager
Deportes La Serena
 Segunda División de Chile: 1987

Cobreloa
 Primera División de Chile: 1992

Chile U20
 FIFA U-20 World Cup third place: 2007

References

Further reading
 Sagredo, Francisco (2011). La Caída: La historia secreta del autogol político y empresarial de Mayne-Nicholls, Bielsa y el fútbol chileno. Editorial Aguilar.

1940 births
Living people
People from Coquimbo
Chilean footballers
Association football fullbacks
Association football wingers
Independent Democratic Union politicians
Deportes La Serena footballers
O'Higgins F.C. footballers
Club Deportivo Palestino footballers
C.D. Atlético Marte footballers
Aurora F.C. players
C.D. Antofagasta footballers
Coquimbo Unido footballers
Chilean expatriate footballers
Expatriate footballers in El Salvador
Chilean expatriate sportspeople in El Salvador
Expatriate footballers in Guatemala
Chilean expatriate sportspeople in Guatemala
Chilean football managers
Coquimbo Unido managers
Deportes La Serena managers
Deportes Antofagasta managers
Cobreloa managers
Club Deportivo Palestino managers
O'Higgins F.C. managers
Rangers de Talca managers
Deportes Iquique managers
Primera B de Chile managers
Chilean Primera División managers
Chilean people of Diaguita descent
Indigenous sportspeople of the Americas
Chile national under-20 football team managers